Zoobilee Zoo is a children's television series featuring actors dressed as animal characters that originally aired from 1986 to 1987. It continued to run in syndication until 2000 on several television channels including commercial network television stations, PBS stations, The Learning Channel, and Hallmark Channel. The original 65 episodes are currently owned by Hallmark Properties and were produced by WQED Pittsburgh.

Hosted by Ben Vereen, the show revolves around a group of six creative animal friends who live in a magical land called Zoobilee Zoo. Each possess a unique artistic skill and they frequently break into song and dance.

Plot
Each episode is opened by a greeting from host Ben Vereen, dressed as a spotted snow leopard, who plays the mayor of Zoobilee Zoo. Speaking directly to viewers that he refers to as "Zoobaroos", Vereen usually appears throughout each episode to summarize the main themes or to perform a song and dance.

The plot in each episode revolves around the main characters, called Zoobles, as they play together and encounter difficulties common to young children. The primary themes are cooperation, making friends, and creativity.

Cast and characters
Each Zooble character has a certain artistic talent that shapes the way they approach different scenario:
 Sandey Grinn as Bill Der Beaver in all but 2 episodes, who likes to invent and fix stuff.
 Michael Sheehan as the original Bill Der Beaver in 2 episodes. When Sheehan decided to leave the show for other interests (such as Jem), he was replaced by Sandey Grinn.
 Forrest Gardner as Van Go Lion, who enjoys art.
 Karen Hartman as Talkatoo Cockatoo, who enjoys reading, writing, and speech.
 Michael B. Moynahan as Lookout Bear, who enjoys adventuring and travel.
 Gary Schwartz as Bravo Fox, who enjoys performing.
 Louise Vallance (Stevie Vallance) as Whazzat Kangaroo, the youngest Zooble who encourages kids to enjoy music and dance.
 Ben Vereen as Mayor Ben, a snow leopard who stars as the host of the show explaining what kind of adventure the Zoobles will be having. Apart from the opening he rarely interacts with any of the other characters.

Minor characters
 Roger Behr as Limerick Leprechaun and Peter Possum
 Roger Peltz as Rhymin' Simon and the Genie
 Crosby the Dog as Crosby
 Suzy Gilstrap as Sandy
 Robert Shields as Elmo the Clown
 Patty Maloney as Ergo
 Helen Lambros as The Witch
 Vinson Crump as Vince
 Norman Merrill as Dr. Feelright 
 Caleb Chung as Bert Backtrack

In addition, Grinn, Schwartz and Vallance have also played some minor characters. Schwartz played the gorilla in "A Camping We Will Go" (revealed in a blooper reel) and Grinn played Bravo's Vaudeville friend Charlie Google in "Vaudeville Star". Due to this, in the respective episodes, neither Bravo nor Bill appear. Vallance voiced Gilda the Tooth Fairy in "When You Wish Upon a Tooth Fairy".

Background and production
Premiering on September 15, 1986, Zoobilee Zoo was produced and directed by Steve Binder. The show's concept was developed by Hallmark Entertainment, which partnered with children's production company DIC Enterprises.

In 1992, The Learning Channel picked up the show as part of its Ready Set Learn lineup for preschoolers.

Episodes were released on a wide array of VHS tapes, the most recent series released in 1997, but not yet released to DVD. In 2000, three new direct-to-video episodes and soundtracks were released, and the stage show Zoobilee Zoo Live! toured briefly.

Reception
Zoobilee Zoo was well-received critically, but earned only modest viewer ratings. It was praised by the National Education Association (NEA), the American Federation of Teachers and the National Association of Elementary School Principals. In addition, it was endorsed by the Action for Children's Television (ACT).

Episodes
"*" Episodes contain Michael Sheehan as Bill Der Beaver. All other segments feature Sandey Grinn in the role.

 A Star is Born
 Two's A Crowd
 Blue Ribbon Zoobles
 Bravo, Come Home!
 Land of Rhymes
 The Genie
 When You Wish Upon a Tooth Fairy
 The Robot Zoobles
 Trading Places
 The Great Trash Mystery*
 Strike Up the Band
 Mystery in Zoobilee Zoo
 Popular Bill
 The Cockatoo/Fox Report
 Grown Up for a Day*
 Winter Wonderland
 Fox in Wolf's Clothing
 Vaudeville Star
 Is There a Doctor in the House?
 Backwardville
 Speak to Me, Bill
 A Sticky Situation
 To See or Not to See
 Just in Time
 Cave Zoobles
 Bear Behind the Badge
 One Touch of Van Go
 Job Hunting
 The Great Game #1
 Lookout, Super Zooble
 Invisible Zooble
 Lookout's Dog
 Endangered Zoobra
 Bravo's Puppets
 The Witch's Spell
 Talkerella
 The Great Game #2
 Van Go, Master Painter
 The Ghost of Zoobilee Woods
 Pigment Puzzle
 Whazzat the Clown
 The Great Zooble Tryouts
 Gotta Dance
 Close Encounters of a Zooble Kind
 Laughland
 Lady Whazzat
 The Zooble Book of Records
 Sing Along #1
 The Magic Ring
 A Trip to Memoryland
 The Zooble Hop
 Attack of the Giant Potatoes
 Teleportation
 Simon and the Leprechaun
 Pictures to Remember
 Smart Dummy
 The Zoobadoobas
 Sing Along #2
 Without a Sound
 Bill Sees Stars
 A Time for Laughs
 A Camping we will Go
 Surprise, Surprise
 Bravo's Party
 Piano Man Bill

Awards and recognition
The series was awarded the 1987 Daytime Emmy for Outstanding Costume Design.

See also

 New Zoo Revue

References

External links
 
 ZoobileeZoo.com

1986 American television series debuts
1987 American television series endings
1980s American children's television series
First-run syndicated television programs in the United States
Television series by DIC Entertainment
Television series by CBS Studios
English-language television shows
American television shows featuring puppetry